"Auntie" Irmgard Keali'iwahinealohanohokahaopuamana Farden Aluli (October 7, 1911 – October 4, 2001) was a Hawaiian composer who wrote over 200 songs. In Hawaii, she was considered a haku mele, or maker of songs. Aluli is considered the most prolific woman composer of Hawaii since Queen Lili'uokalani. She is the fourth person to be honored twice for a Lifetime Achievement Award by the Hawai'i Academy of Recording Arts (HARA). She has also been inducted into the Hawaiian Music Hall of Fame.

Biography 
Aluli was born in Pu‘unoa, Lahaina, Maui T. Hawai‘i, on October 7, 1911. She was born into a large family of 13 children (Margaret, Annie, Carl, Bernard, Emma, Maude, Aurora, Diana, Irmgard, Rudolph, Lurina, Edna & Llewellyn "Buddy)," One of Hawai‘i's foremost Musical Families. Her parents were Annie Kahalepouli (Bastel Shaw) Farden and Charles (née Karl) Kekua Farden and she was of Hawaiian, French-German and Hungarian ancestry.

Aluli first started performing publicly with the Annie Kerr Trio in 1925. She had an alto voice and could play piano, ‘ukulele, bass and guitar. Aluli wrote her first song in 1935, called "Three Lovely White Blossoms;" followed shortly by "Peke Nui" AKA "Down on Maunakea Street."

In 1937, she had her first hit, "Puamana," which was a song she wrote about her childhood home in Lahaina. "Puamana" has become a standard for hula dancers and Hawaiian musicians.

In 196s, she started a group called Puamana. The group started out as a trio (Irmgard, her sister Diana and Close friend and Annie Kerr Alum, Thelma Anahū).  In 1976, Irmgard amended the group include her daughters Neaulani Aluli Spaulding and Mihana ‘Āluli Souza.  After Neaulani's death her niece, Luanna Farden McKenney and her daughter Aima McManus were added to the group. A short film was created by Les Blank, Meleanna Meyer and Chris Simon about Puamana in 1991. The film features the group and also includes interviews with Aluli.

Aluli performed publicly often, until she hurt her hand in 1998. In 1998, she was honored with her induction into the Hawaiian Music Hall of Fame. She continued to play ukulele and made "occasional appearances until a few weeks before her death." Aluli died on October 4, 2001, in Honolulu.

In 2015, Puamana, which has continued under the leadership of her daughters and granddaughter earned a Lifetime Achievement Award from HARA.

References

External links 
 Irmgard Farden Aluli (video)

1911 births
2001 deaths
American composers
Musicians from Hawaii
Native Hawaiian musicians
People from Maui
Songwriters from Hawaii